Yiddish words used in the English language include both words that have been assimilated into Englishused by both Yiddish and English speakersand many that have not. An English sentence that uses either may be described by some as Yinglish  (or Hebronics), though a secondary sense of the term Yinglish describes the distinctive way certain Jews in English-speaking countries add many Yiddish words into their conversation, beyond general Yiddish words and phrases used by English speakers. 

In this meaning, Yinglish is not the same as Yeshivish, which is spoken by many Orthodox Jews, though the two share many parallels.

Yiddish
Many of these words have not been assimilated into English and are unlikely to be understood by English speakers who do not have substantial Yiddish knowledge. Leo Rosten's book The Joys of Yiddish explains these words (and many more) in detail. With the exceptions of blintz, kosher (used in English slang), and shmo, none of the other words in this list are labeled as Yinglish in Rosten's book.

Primarily Ashkenazi Orthodox Jews will use Yiddish, Hebrew, or Aramaic words while speaking a version of English. Many of these do not translate directly into English or have a different connotation: for example, a secular (English) "Book" but a holy (Hebrew) "Sefer"; or regular "lights" but a "Shabbos Leichter" (or "Lachter" depending on sub-group type). This will vary from 10% in "normal" speech to 90% in a lecture or Talmudic discussion. Sephardic Jews might do the same but do not normally understand Yiddish and would only use Hebrew or Aramaic terms.

As with Yiddish, Yinglish has no set transliteration standard; as the primary speakers of Yinglish are, by definition, Anglophones (whether first-language or not), Yinglish used in running speech tends to be transliterated using an English-based orthography. This, however, varies, sometimes in the same sentence. For instance, the word פֿאַרקאַקטע may be spelled farkakte, ferkockte, verkackte, among others. In its roots, though, Yiddish (whether used as English slang or not) is fundamentally mediaeval High German; although mediaeval German suffered from the same vagaries in spelling, it later became standardised in Modern High German. This list shall use the same conventions as Modern High German, with the exception of certain words, the spellings of which have been standardised. Furthermore, common nouns shall be left lowercase, as in English.

Yinglish
Yinglish words (also referred to colloquially as Hebronics) are neologisms created by speakers of Yiddish in English-speaking countries, sometimes to describe things that were uncommon in the old country. Leo Rosten's book The Joys of Yiddish uses the words Yinglish and Ameridish to describe new words, or new meanings of existing Yiddish words, created by English-speaking persons with some knowledge of Yiddish. Rosten defines "Yinglish" as "Yiddish words that are used in colloquial English" (such as kibitzer) and Ameridish as words coined by Jews in the United States; his use, however, is sometimes inconsistent. According to his definition on page x, alrightnik is an Ameridish word; however, on page 12 it is identified as Yinglish.

While "Yinglish" is generally restricted in definition to the adaptation of Yiddish lemmas to English grammar by Jews, its usage is not explicitly restricted to Jews. This is especially true in areas where Jews are highly concentrated, but in constant interaction with their Gentile fellows, esp. in the larger urban areas of North America. In such circumstances, it would not be unusual to hear, for example, a Gentile griping about having "shlepped" a package across town.

The portmanteau word Yinglish is first recorded in 1942. Similar colloquial portmanteau words for Yiddish influenced English include: Yidlish (recorded from 1967), Yiddiglish (1980), and Yenglish (2000). A number of other terms have been promulgated, such as Engdish and Engliddish, but these have not enjoyed widespread adoption.

Yinglish was formerly assigned the ISO 639-3 code yib, but it was retired on July 18, 2007, on the grounds that it is entirely intelligible with English.

A 

 aidim (Yid., איידעם): son-in-law, from middle-high-German eidam
 a schande (Yid., אַ שאַנדע): a disgrace; one who brings embarrassment through mere association, cf. German eine Schande, translated "a disgrace", meaning "such a shame"
 a schande far di goyim (Yid., אַ שאַנדע פֿאַר די גוים): "A disgrace before (in front of) the Gentiles", the scathing criticism of Judge Julius Hoffman by Abbie Hoffman during the trial of the Chicago Eight, whereby goyim means nation, people or non-Jews. Also spelled in varied phonetic and Germanic ways as "a shanda fur di goyim," "a schande fur die goyim," and so forth. Sometimes partially mistranslated as "a shande for the goyim," though far here means before and not for.
 ay-ay-ay (Yid., אײַ־אײַ־אײַ) (sometimes spelled "ai-yi-yi" or spoken "Ei, yei, yei")
 abi gezunt! (Yid., אַבי געזונט): the first word is Slavic: compare Ukrainian aby (аби) and Belarusian aby, both meaning "if" or "if only."  The second word is Germanic, cognate to High German gesund.  The phrase thus means "As long as you're healthy!"; often used as an ironic punchline to a joke
 abi me lebt (Yid., אַבי מע לעבט): abi from Slavic, as in the previous entry; me lebt cognate to the German, man lebt,' meaning "At least I'm alive"
 alter kicker or alter kacker (Yid., אַלטער קאַקער):  an old fart (from German Alter "old" and kacker "crapper")  Also sometimes spelled phonetically (from the American point of view) as "alte kocker."

B
 bagel (Yid., בייגל): A round bread product
 balabusta (Yid., בעל־הביתטע): a homemaker; usually applied with positive connotations
 bentsch (Yid., בֶּענְטְשֶׁן‬‎): to bless, commonly referred to saying Grace after meals (bentsching) or when lighting shabbat candles (bentsch-light), from Latin, "benedicere", (to bless).
 billig or billik (Yid., ביליק): cheap, shoddy (said of merchandise); common expression "Billig is Teir"  (cheap is expensive). From Middle Low German billich, "cheap."
 bissel (Yid., ביסל): a small amount, "a pinch of" something (cf. Austrian/Bavarian bissl, a dialectal variant of the more standard German bisschen, "a little bit")
 blintz (Yid., בלינצע blintse): a sweet cheese-filled crepe
 bris: the circumcision of a male child. From ברית meaning "covenant", which is pronounced 'brit' in Modern Hebrew. The last letter of the word, 'ת' without dagesh, is pronounced as an 'S' in traditional Ashkenazi Hebrew, derived from the Tiberian Hebrew pronunciation, TH as in "think"; see begadkefat. 
 boychik (Yid., בויטשיק‎ boytshik): sweetheart; usually, a young boy or young man. A blend of English boy and Russian ма́льчик (malchik, "boy").
 broigus (Yid. ברוגז broygez): a bitter feud of anger; from Hebrew ברוגז (berogez, "angry")
 bubbeh, bubbe (Yid., באָבע): grandmother; the "u" pronounced like "uh" and the "e" pronounced like "bee", not like the Southern U.S. nickname (cf. the Slavonic baba, "old woman" with different overtones in different languages). 
 bubbeleh (Yid., באָבעלע): a term of endearment;  a young boy-child, deriving from the German for "little bean" or "fritter"; lovingly used by Morticia Addams with her husband Gomez Addams in the 1964 TV series The Addams Family. 
 bubbameisse (Yid., בובמייסס):  Old wives' tale, cock and bull story (often attributed by erroneous folk etymology to combination of bubbe, "grandmother", and meisse, "tale", but in fact derives from "Bove-meisse", from the "Bove Bukh", the "Book of Bove", the chivalric adventures of fictitious knight Sir Bevys ("Bove") of Hampton, first published in Yiddish in 1541 and continually republished until 1910.
 bubkes (Yid., באָבקעס‎; also spelled "bupkis"): emphatically nothing, as in He isn't worth bubkes (literally "goat droppings", from באָב‎ (bob, "bean") + ־קע‎ (-ke, diminutive))

C
 chalisch (Yid., חלש halish): literally, fainting ("I was chalishing from hunger"), sometimes used as a term of desperate desire for something or someone ("After a thirty-six hour shift, I was chalishing to go home already.")
 chazerei (Yiddish, חזירײַ khazerai "filth" or, perhaps more literally, "piggery", from חזיר khazer "pig" from Hebrew  "hazeer", pig): junk, garbage, junk food
 chesid (Yid., חסד): good deed or favor.  "Do me a chesid and clean your room." From the Hebrew chesed, "loving-kindness."
 chidush or chiddush: (from Hebrew  hadash, meaning "new") the point, upshot, or reason, of a discussion or argument; the conclusion drawn from two or more premises; more generally, innovation.  For example: "I don't get it, what's the chidush?"  Also used when you are making fun of someone for something entirely obvious. "Chidush! Chidush!"
 cholent (Yid., טשאָלנט‎ tsholnt): a stew cooked over night. From Old French chalant, "warming."
chutzpah: (Yid. from Heb.  hutspe, alt. sp. ) Courage, determination, daring; also audacity, effrontery.  Similar in meaning to English slang guts, balls, or nerve.  Can carry either a positive or negative connotation.

D
 daven (Yid., דאַװ(ע)נען dav(e)nen): pray (referring to any of the three Jewish daily prayers). Possibly of Romance origin, from Latin dīvīnus (divine).
 dreck or drek (Yid., דרעק from German Dreck, "manure", "dirt"): Material of low worth or lacking in quality; used especially of merchandise. Akin to dregs, "remains."
 dybbuk: (Yid. from Heb.  dibbuk, that which clings) a ghost; the malevolent spirit of a dead person which enters and controls a living body until exorcised.

E
 ekht (Yid., עכט): real, true (from German echt, "real")
 emes (Yid., אמת): the truth. From Hebrew אמת emet, "truth."
 eppes (Yid., עפּעס) a little, not much, something. Probably from Old High German eddeshwaz, with the eventual /-tw-/ assimilating into /-p-/.
 ess (Yid., עס; "Iss!" German imperative for "Eat!"): to eat, especially used in the imperative: Ess!  Ess!

F
 fachnyok (Yid. פֿכניאָק): negative term meaning very religious, often used to connote someone holier-than-thou. Can be shortened to "chenyok", or used as a noun ("don't be such a chenyok") or an adjective ("you're so chnyokish"). Possibly derived from Russian хныка (khnyika).
 farkakte (Yid. פֿאַרקאַקטע‎): screwed up, contemptible; literally "shat upon" (see verkackte)
 farklemt (Yid. פֿאַרקלעמט): choked up (with emotion) (cf. German verklemmt) 
 farmisht (Yid. פֿאַרמישט): confused (cf. German vermischt = intermingled, mixed)
 farshtunken: contemptible, nasty (cf. German verstunken)
 feh (Yid. פֿע‎): expression of disgust.
 feygele or faygeleh (Yid. פֿייגעלע‎): (pejorative) homosexual (literally 'little bird', from Old High German fogal; cf. modern German Vögele, also possible cf. German word Feigling, meaning 'coward'), could be used for anyone slightly effeminate, "Ugh, that, Moishele washes his hands, what a faygel." Often used as a disparaging term for a homosexual male.
 fress (Yid. פֿרעסן): to eat, especially with enthusiasm (German fressen = "to eat like an animal, in an untidy way")
 frum (Yid. פֿרום): adjective; religious, specifically in the area of Judaism. (cf. German "Fromm" = pious)
 frimmer (Yid. פֿרומר): (British English slang): a Hasidic Jew (from Yiddish "frum", religious; also cf. German "Frommer" = pious person)
 futz (Yid. פֿוץ): verb; fool around.

G
 gantz; gantze (Yid. גאַנץ): all, the whole of ("the ganze mischpache" = the whole family, etc., cf. German ganz = "whole, all")
 gei gesund (Yid. גיי געזונט gey gezunt): (from German) go in health; used as a goodbye.  Repeated in reply. Usually neutral, but can be used sarcastically to mean "good riddance".
 gei avek (Yid. גיי אַוועק): go away, from German.
 gei shlofen (Yid. גיי שלופֿן): (from German) go [to] sleep.
 gehivays (Yid. גיי ווייס): literally "go know", as in "go figure". ("Last week she said she hated his guts and now she's engaged to him. Geh vays.")
 gelt (Yid. געלט): (from German Geld, Yiddish געלט) money; also chocolate coins eaten on Hanukkah
 genug (from German genug; Yiddish גענוג): enough
 geschmad, geschmadde (Yid. געשמד, from Hebrew  meshumad, "destroyed"): adjective meaning "(a Jew who) converted to Christianity".
 gesundheit (געזונטערהייט): (from German) interjection said after a sneeze, equivalent to "bless you". Literally means "health".
 gewalt (Yid. געוואלד; from German Gewalt, violence): equivalent to "oi, weh" or "good grief!" Literally "violence".
 glück (Yid. גליק, German): a piece of good luck 
 glitch: a minor malfunction (possibly from Yiddish גליטש glitsh, "slippery place", from German glitschig, "slippy")
 goilem or golem (Yid. גולם): a man-made humanoid; an android, Frankenstein monster, or an insult, suggesting that a person has no mental capacity.
 gonef or gonif (Yid. גנבֿ, also ganiv): thief (Hebrew  ganav. This can be used as a somewhat generic insult, implying a "lowlife"): the word has also been adopted from Yiddish into German as Ganove, also a thief (often figurative)
 gornisht (Yid. גאָרנישט, from German gar nichts = nothing at all): nothing, not a bit, for naught
 goy (Yid. גוי): Someone not of the Jewish faith or people; a gentile (plural  Goyim, Hebrew 'nation(s)', often referring to nations other than Israel, although the Tanach calls Israel the "goy koddesh", "the Holy Nation", so Israel is also a 'goy' ["nation" in the sense of "a people", not "a state"]) "What's John Smith doing in temple, he's a goy!" "Goy" can have a neutral connotation (non-Jews), a negative connotation (not astute, or too aggressive), or a positive connotation (formal, polite). Also, among religious Jews, a derogatory term for a Jew who is both nonobservant and ignorant of Jewish law. A Jew who is learned in Jewish law but chooses not to observe it would be called an Apikoyres (Epicurean, i.e., freethinker)
 goyisher mazel (Yid. גוייִשר מזל): good luck (lit. "Gentile luck"). Mazel is from Hebrew מזל mazzal, referring to luck or fate.
 graube (Yid. גרויב): (from German grobe, rough) coarsely or crudely made.

H
 hegdesch (Yid. העגדעש): pigpen, often used to describe a mess (as in "your room is a hegdesch")
 hock (Yid. האַק): Bother, pester (as in the character Major Hochstetter from Hogan's Heroes; a hockstetter being someone who constantly bothers you); a contraction of the idiom Hakn a tshaynik (literally "to knock a teakettle"; Yiddish:  האַקן אַ טשײַניק), from the old time pre-whistle teakettles whose tops clank against the rim as the pressure pushed them up and down. Often partially translated in informal speech, as in, "Don't hock my tshaynik about it!" ("Don't pester me about it!")
 hocker (Yid. האַקר): botherer, pesterer (see above)
 heymish (Yid. היימיש; also haimish): home-like, friendly, folksy (German heimisch)

I
 ikh vais (Yid. איך װייס): I know (German Ich weiß).
 ipish (Yid. יפּפּיש): a bad odor. From Hebrew ipush, "musty smell".

K
 kadoches (Yid. קדחת): a fever; frequently occurs in oaths of ill-will (e.g., "I'll give him a kadoches is what I'll give him!). From Hebrew  kedachat.
 keppalah (Yid. קאפעלע): forehead, diminutive of keppe.
 keppe (Yid. קאָפּ): head (e.g. "I needed that like a loch in keppe", i.e. a hole in my head); German "Kopf", coll. "Kopp": "head"; German "Loch": "hole".
 keyn ayn horeh (Yid. קיינ יינ-אָרע; also pronounced: kin ahurrah): lit., "No evil eye!"; German kein: none; Hebrew  ayn—eye,  harrah—bad, evil; an apotropaic formula spoken to avert the curse of jealousy after something or someone has been praised; the phrase has mutated into "Don't give me a canary!" in the Bronx.
 khaloymes (Yid. כאָלעם): dreams, fantasies; used in the sense of "wild dreams" or "wishful thinking", as in "Ah, boy, that's just khaloymes, it'll never come true." From the Hebrew  khalom (dream), pl. khalomot.
 kibitz (Yid. קיביטז): to offer unwanted advice, e.g. to someone playing cards; to converse idly, gossip; to josh or rib a person (Yiddish קיבעצען kibetsn), German thieves' jargon kiebitschen "to examine, search, look through", influenced by German Kiebitz (lapwing, AKA peewit or green plover [imitative]).
 kife or kyfe (Yid. קייפ): enjoyment. From Arabo-Persian keyf 'opiate; intoxication; pleasure, enjoyment'.
 kishkes (Yid. קישקע): intestines, guts. In the singular, a kind of sausage stuffed with finely chopped potatoes, carrots, onions, spices, etc., rather than meat. In slang, the "guts" of a mechanical object: "The car was up on blocks with its kishkes hanging out."
 Kitsch (Yid קיטש): trash, especially gaudy trash (German Kitsch, from dialectal kitschen ("to coat, to smear"))
 klop (Yid. קלאַפּ): a loud bang or wallop (German klopfen = "to knock")
 klumnik (Yid. קלומניק): empty person, a good-for-nothing (From Hebrew  klum, nothing.)
 klutz: clumsy person (from Yiddish קלאָץ klots 'wooden beam', German "Klotz") "Shloimy, you wear your hat like a klutz."
 knish (Yid. קניש): a baked or fried dumpling with a savory filling 
 kosher (Yid. קאָשער): conforming to Jewish dietary laws; (slang) appropriate, legitimate (originally from Hebrew ) see Yashrusdik.
 krankhayt (Yid. קראַנקהייַט): a sickness (German Krankheit)
 kugel (Yid. קוגעל): a casserole or pudding, usually made from egg noodles (lochshen) or potatoes (cf. German Kugel, ball)
 kvell: beaming / being proud "Shlomo, when you said the prayer so well, I knew I would kvell." Yiddish verb קוועלן (kvelln), sharing a root with German quellen ("well up").
 kvetch, kvatch: to complain habitually, gripe; or, a person who always complains, sometimes known as whinge (from Yiddish קװעטשן kvetshn and German quetschen ("press, squeeze").

L
 latke: potato pancake, especially during Hanukkah (from Yiddish לאַטקע, from Ukrainian/Russian латка, "pastry")
 l'chaim (Yid. לחיים): an expression of joy, the traditional toast "to life!" 
 l'ch'oira: (Yid. לכוירה) "seemingly". From Hebrew לכאורה lichora. Ultimately from אור or, "light", as light is being shed on what has happened.
 Litvak (Yid. ליטוואַק): a Lithuanian Jew, from Polish Litwak, "Lithuanian".
 lobbus: a rascal, or young mischievous person. From לאָבעס lobes, לאָבוס lobus 'urchin, young rascal'.
 lox: salt-cured salmon (from Yiddish לאַקס laks and German Lachs 'salmon') eaten with bagels. Not to be confused with smoked salmon.
 luzim (Yid. לאָזן): let it go, forget about it, from Old High German lazan, "let, allow". Famously used by the "Indians" in Blazing Saddles, where Mel Brooks says luzim gayen (לאָזן גיין), "let him go."

M
 macher (Yid. מאַכער): lit. "doer, someone who does things", big shot, important person (e.g. within an organization) (German machen = doing or making sth.) "Now that Golde is the president, she acts like such a big macher."
 maiseh (Yid. מייסע): lit. "deed, occurrence", a story or vignette about a person or event, (Heb. ma'aseh (same meaning as in Yiddish, though infrequently used). A small problem that blew up into a big story would be called a "ganze maiseh". Also famous in the phrase a "bubbe maiseh", the equivalent of the English idiom "an old wives' tale".
 mama-loshen (Yid. מאמאלושן): one's first or native language, from Yiddish mama (mother) plus Hebrew לשון lashon, tongue or language
 mamish (Yid. ממש): really, very (an expression of emphasis) From the Hebrew ממש (mamash), "substantially"
 mamzer (Yid. ממזר): bastard, literally or figuratively (from Biblical Hebrew ממזר, meaning the child of a married woman where the biological father is not the married woman's husband, making the term slightly more specific than the English word illegitimate)
 maydl (Yid. מײדל): Girl, young woman, from Austrian Maedel. "That's a shayne (pretty) Maydl."
 mazel (from Hebrew מזל mazal): luck (literally, constellation of stars)
 mazel tov! (מזל־טובֿ! mazl tof): congratulations! (literally, 'good constellation' from Hebrew, meaning, May you be born under a good star, or at a good time. When you tell someone Mazel Tov, it is customary to shake hands.) Literally, good luck.
 mechaye (Yid. מחיה): a source of pleasure (from the Hebrew חיים "chayim", meaning "life")
 mechutanista (f) / mechutan (m) / mechutanim (pl) or Machtainista (f): kinship term for one's child's female or male parent-in-law (Yid. מעחוטאַניסטאַ, from Hebrew מחותן mekhután, "belonging to the groom").
 megillah: a lengthy document or discourse (from Yiddish מגילה megile, from Hebrew 'scroll'). Production: "What are you making, a megillah?" The plural, in Yinglish, is Megillas. Aside from those who might say megilloth or Megillot, expect to hear Megillos.(see the HaMesh vs. CHomeish in)
 Meh / Mnyeh: An expression of indifference or boredom
 meiven (a variant of maven): expert (from Yiddish מבֿין meyvn, from Hebrew mevin 'one who understands')
 mensch: an upright man or woman; a gentleman; a decent human being (from Yiddish מענטש mentsh 'person' and German Mensch: human being). It has become the generic term for a virtuous man or person; one with honesty, integrity, loyalty, firmness of purpose: a fundamental sense of decency and respect for other people.
 meshuga / meshugge / meshugah / meshuggah (משוגען meshugn): crazy (from Yiddish meshuge, from Hebrew meshugah, insane)
 meshuggener: a crazy person (from Yiddish meshugener)
 meshugaas: nonsense (lit. "craziness")
 minyan (Yid. מנין): the quorum of ten adult (i.e., 13 or older) Jews (among the Orthodox, males) who are necessary for the holding of a public worship service
 mishegoss: a crazy, mixed up, insane situation; irrationality (from Yiddish משוגעת meshugas, from meshuge 'crazy')
 mishpocha (Yid. משפּחה): family (from Hebrew משפּחה mishpachah)
 mitzve (Yid. מצווה): good deed (from Hebrew מצווה mitzvah, a religious duty incumbent upon a Jew)
 mohel (Yid. מוהל moyl): a professional religious circumciser (from Hebrew מוֹהֵל mōhēl)

N
 naches / nachas (נחת): pleasure, satisfaction, delight; proud enjoyment (usage: I have naches from you) (from Hebrew  nachat, "relaxation")
 narishkeit (Yid. נאַרישקײט): foolishness (German "närrisch"—foolish)
 nasherai (Yid. נאַשערײַ): snack food (German naschen—to snack, cf. German Nascherei)
 nebbish (Yid. נעביש): a hapless, unfortunate person, much to be pitied; the one who cleans up after the schlemiel's accidents. From Eastern Yiddish נעבעך (nebekh), "unfortunately", from Slavic (compare Old Polish niebog), from Proto-Slavic *nebogъ ("poor, unfortunate").
 noodge (Yid. נודזש‎ nudzsh): a person who persistently pesters, annoys, or complains. Also a verb: to act like a noodge. From Yiddish נודיען (nudyen), "to bore". Ultimately from Proto-Slavic *nuda; compare Russian ну́дный (núdnyj, "tedious"), Polish nudny ("boring")
 nosh: snack (from Yiddish נאַשן nashn) Also a verb "Nu, stop noshing on that nosh."
 nu (Yid. נו): multipurpose interjection often analogous to "well?" or "so?"; of the same linguistic origin as English now (Russian "ну"), or possibly from Romanian "nu"='no'?
 nudnik (Yid. נודניק): pest, "pain in the neck", originally from Polish ("nuda" in Polish means "boredom"; nudziarz is the Polish word for the Yiddish nudnik)

O
 oy: (exclamation) Oh!; Oy Gutt—Oh (my) God!
 oy gevalt (אױ גװאַלד): Oh no! (from Yiddish gvald 'emergency'). Cognate with German Gewalt "force, violence".
 oy vey (אױ װײ): (exclamation) Oh, woe! (Oh no!—literally, "Oh, pain!", cf. German Weh "pain", English woe
 oy vey iz mir: (exclamation) from אױ װײ איז מיר 'Oh, woe is me!', 'Oh, my suffering
 oytzer (Yid. ויצער oitser): sweetheart, dear (from Hebrew אוֹצָר otsar, "treasure")

P
 pisher (Yid. פּישער): a male infant; a little squirt; a nobody, (Cognate with English and German "Pisser", originating from German pissen, to piss)
 potch: a light spanking or disciplinary slap, done usually by a parent to a child, and often taking place on the top of the hand or the buttocks (Yiddish verb פּאַטשן patshn, South German word patschen meaning slap).
 plotz: to burst, as from strong emotion: "I was so angry, I thought I'd plotz!" (from Yiddish פּלאַצן platsn 'to crack', cf. German platzen)
 pulke (Yid. פולקע): thigh, particularly fat ones on babies. From Russian пол (pol), "half."
 punkt farkert (Yid. פונקט פארקערט) : just the opposite, total disagreement.  German:  punkt verkehrt; lit "point turn" = wrong.
 punim: the face (Yiddish פּנים ponem, from Hebrew פָּנִים panim)
 pupik (Yid. פּופּיק): the navel; belly button (Polish pępek, navel) (used by American comedian Moe Howard in the short subject film You Nazty Spy! from 1940)
 putz: unclean penis; stupid 'dirty' person, a jerk (from Yiddish פּאָץ pots, probably from Romanian puță, "dick")

R
 rachmones (Yid. רחמנות): mercy, pity; from Hebrew רַחְמָנוּת rakhmanut
 redd (Yid. רעד): 'to redd a shidduch': to recommend a person for marriage. From Middle High German reden, "speak."
 rutzer (Yid. רוצר): very young and inexperienced. From German Rotz, "snot."

S
 schicker (Yid. שיכור shikhur) or schickered: drunk, intoxicated (from the Hebrew שיכור shikor: drunk, cf. German [coll.] angeschickert "soused, tipsy")
 schissel or shisl (Yid. שיסל): bowl, especially a large mixing bowl (from German Schüssel, bowl)
 schlemiel: an inept clumsy person; a bungler; a dolt (from Yiddish שלומיאל shlemil or שלימיל shlimil from the Hebrew "Sh'aino Mo'eil" or "She'lo Mo'il" literally ineffective, or it doesn't help)
 schlep: to drag or haul (an object); to make a tedious journey (from Yiddish שלעפּן shlepn and German schleppen)
 schlepper: bum (Yiddish שלעפּר shlepr and German schleppen)
 schlimazel / schlamazel: a chronically unlucky person (שלימזל shlimazl, from shlim "bad" and mazl "luck"). The difference between a shlemiel and a shlimazel is described through the aphorism, "A shlemiel is somebody who often spills his soup; a shlimazel is the person the soup lands on." One of the ten non-English words that a British translation company identified as being the most difficult to translate into English in June 2004. (from Yiddish shlimazl cf. German Schlamassel)  Schlemeil and Schlamazel  appear in the theme song for the television sitcom Laverne and Shirley.
 schlock: A poorly made product or poorly done work, usually quickly thrown together for the appearance of having been done properly; "this writing is schlock." Something shoddy or inferior. (from Yiddish שלאַק‎ shlak, from German Schlacke, "slag")
 schlong (Yiddish שלאַנג): In vulgar usage, "penis." (from German Schlange, "snake")
 schlub (Yid. זשלאָב‎ zshlab): a clumsy, stupid, or unattractive person. Perhaps from Polish żłób ("trough, furrow")
 schmaltz: excessive sentimentality; chicken fat or drippings used as a schmeer on bread (from Yiddish שמאַלץ shmalts and Old High German Smalz). In modern German there is 'Schmalz' (grease made from animals) as well as he adjective 'schmalzig', a negative term for something overly emotional or kitschig, such as a movie.
 schmeckle (Yid. שמעקל): a little penis, often ascribed to a baby boy. Diminutive of שמאָק shmok, "penis."
 schmeer (Yid. שמיר) also schmear: as a verb, to spread, e.g., the cream cheese on your bagel; also, as a noun, that which you spread on something, e.g., "I'll have a piece of challah with a schmeer."  Can also mean ″to bribe″ (to spread money on someone's hands). (cf. German schmieren)
 schmo (Yid. שמוֹ): a stupid person. (An alteration of schmuck; see below.) Most often used in the reference to "Joe Schmo," any ordinary person.
 schmooze: to converse informally, to small talk or chat. Can also be a form of brown-nosing (from Yiddish שמועסן shmuesn—cf. German schmusen; ultimately from Hebrew שְׁמוּעוֹת‎ (sh'mu'ót), plural of שְׁמוּעָה‎ (sh'mu'á, "report, piece of news, rumor"), related to שָׁמַע‎ (shamá), "to hear"). The word is commonly used in the business world to refer to informal networking activities
 schmuck: a contemptible or foolish person; a jerk; literally means "penis" (from Yiddish שמאָק shmok 'penis')
 schmutz (Yiddish שמוץ): buildup; dirt, often pertaining to petty household dirt (on the table, floor, clothes etc.) Also used metaphorically to the English equivalent; smut, soot, sleaze (from German Schmutz)
 schnook (Yid. שנוק): an easily imposed-upon or cheated person, a pitifully meek persona ; particularly gullible person. From German Schnucke, "small sheep."
 schnor / tsnorr (Yid. שנאָר): to beg
 schnorrer (Yid. שנאָרער): beggar or moocher (cf. German Schnorrer, schnorren)
 schnoz / schnozzle / shnozzle: a nose, especially a large nose. cf. English nozzle. (from Yiddish שנויץ shnoits 'snout', cf. German Schnauze "snout")
 schrai (Yid. שרײ): a shriek or wail, sometimes used to connote exaggerated hysterics. ("When I told her I'd be ten minutes late, she let out such a shrai!") (cf. German Schrei)
 schtick'l: a little piece of something, usually food. Dim. of stick, from German Stückchen. In "delis", salami ends were sold from a plate on the counter labeled "A nickel a schtickel"
 schtupp / schtuff: (vulgar) to have sex with, screw (from Yiddish שטופּן shtupn 'push, poke'; similar to 'stuff'); to fill, as in to fill someone's pocket with money. ("Schtupp him $50.") Frequently used in the former context by Triumph the Insult Comic Dog. In German 'stopfen' means to (overly) fill or to stuff something.
 schverr (Yid. שװער): father-in-law (German Schwager, obsolete form "Schwäher")
 schvigger (Yid. שװיגער): mother-in-law (German Schwiegermutter)
 schvitz (Yid. שװײס shveys): Bluster, Sweat (German schwitzen)
 Shabbos goy: A non-Jew who performs labour forbidden on the Jewish Sabbath for observant Jews; sometimes used (by implication) for someone who "does the dirty work" for another person. (from Yiddish שבת Shabbos, Sabbath and גױ goy, a non-Jew)
 shammes: the beadle or sexton of a synagogue (from Yiddish שאַמעס shames, an attendant; originally from Hebrew שמש shamash "servant")
 shep naches (Yid. שעפּ נחת‎): take pride. Sometimes shortened to "shep". ("Your son got into medical school? You must be shepping.") From שעפּן (shepn), "derive", from Old High German scaphan; and Hebrew נחת‎ nachat, "contentment."
 sheygetz or shegetz (שגץ שײגעץ): (semi-pejorative) Gentile male—the male form of Shiksa. (from Hebrew שקץ sheqets, "vermin") 
 sheyne meydel (Yid. שײנע מײדל): a beautiful girl (cf. German schönes Mädel)
 shiksa (Yid. שיקסע): (usually considered pejorative) a Gentile woman. (from Hebrew שקץ, sheqets, "vermin")
 Shiva (Yid. שבעה‎ shive): The mourning of seven days after one dies by his family. From Hebrew שבעה‎ shiv'a, "seven".
 shmatte, schmutter (Yid. שמאַטע): an old rag. Used literally: I spilled the coffee, bring me a shmatte, quick! Used figuratively (usu. derisively): That fancy dress she spent half her husband's money on just looked like a shmatte to me. (Cf. Polish szmata "rag, piece of cloth",  shmata "old rag") Used ironically: "I'm in the schmatte business", meaning "I manufacture or sell clothing."
 shmegege (Yid. שמעגעגע): a stupid person, a truly unlucky one; has been said to be the one who cleans up the soup the shlemiel spilled on the shlimazel.
 shmendrik (Yid.  שמענדריק‎): ineffectual person. From Shmendrik, an 1877 opera in Yiddish by Abraham Goldfaden.
 shpiel: an act; a lengthy, often instructive talk (from Yiddish שפּיל shpil and German Spiel "play, game")
 shpilkes (Yid. שפּילקעס): nervous energy; to be feeling "antsy", to be "sitting on pins and needles". Cf. Polish szpilka, "pin"
 shtark (Yid. שטאַרק), shtarker: strong, brave (German stark), zealously religious
 shtick: comic theme; a defining habit or distinguishing feature (from Yiddish שטיק shtik, 'a piece of something': cf. German Stück, "piece").
 shtotty (Yid. שטאָטי): fancy or elegant; may sometimes be pejorative ("She thinks she's so shtotty with that new dress of hers.")
 shtuch (Yid. שטוך): to put someone down, often facetiously ("I shtuched him out." Can be used as a noun to refer to a clever put-down or rejoinder ("When I told my father that my stupidity must be hereditary, it was such a good shtuch!")
 shtick dreck (Yid. שטיק דרעק): literally "a piece of dirt" (see Dreck), but usually applied to a person who is hated because of the antisocial things he has done: "He's a real shtuck dreck." Possibly shtick dreck: a piece of crap. Cf. German Stück Dreck.
 shtum: quiet, silent (Yid. שטום shtum "mute", German stumm)
 shtup: (slang) have sex [with] (Yid. שטופּן shtupn "to push", perhaps related to German stupsen “nudge”)
 shtuss (Yid. שטות): nonsense, foolishness (from Hebrew שטות shetut, pl. shetuyot); also the name of a card game. In German, 'Stuss' means nonsense.
 shvartzer: (שװאַרצער): Black person (either neutral or possibly derogatory depending on context) (from שװאַרץ shvarts "black", German schwarz)
 shvitz (Yid. שװיִץ‎): A steam bath (German schwitzen = to sweat). Also used for sweat or some kind of dirt or filth (German Schwitz)

T
 takeh (Yid. טאַקע): really, totally. "This is takeh a problem!" From Russian/Ukrainian таки (taki), "still, after all, in spite of."
 tchepen sikh (טשעפּענ זיך tshepen zikh): to bother someone incessantly ("Stop tcheppening me!") or to playfully banter with someone ("We spent the entire date tcheppening each other about what bad taste the other one had.") From Polish czepiać sie, "cling to, find fault with."
 tchotchke: knick-knack, trinket, miscellaneous curios of no obvious practical use (from Yiddish טשאַטשקע tshatshke and possibly from цяцька, tsyatska, a Ukrainian word for toy). May refer to pretty women.
 tornig (Yid. טורניג): a disobedient nephew
 traif (or trayf; Yid. טרייף): forbidden, non-Kosher foods; anything forbidden (from Exodus 22:30, technically referring to an animal with any of a specific group of physical defects making it inedible). From Hebrew טְרֵפָה‎ (trēfáh).
 tsaddik (Yid. צדיק): pious, righteous person; one of the 36 legendary saints for whose sake God does not destroy the world. From Hebrew צַדִּיק‎ ("righteous person").
 tsim gezunt (Yid. צים געזונט): to [your] health! Used as a response to a sneeze; from German gesund, "healthy")
 Tsekruchen(a):to be bent over, to be dejected. "Don't be so Tsekruchen all the time, lighten up a bit"
 tsimmis, tsimmes (Yid. צימעס‎): a fuss, a disturbance.  "So you lost a dime. Don't make a big tsimmis!"  Also, a kind of prune or carrot stew. From Yiddish tzim (צים, "for") and esn (עסן, "eating") or from German zu mischen, "to mix."
 tsuris: troubles (from Yiddish צרות tsores, from Hebrew צָרָה tsara)
 tuchas or tochis: buttocks (from Yiddish תּחת tokhes, from Hebrew תַּחַת taḥat)
 tummeler (Yid. טאַמלער): raucous comedian, e.g. Jerry Lewis, Robin Williams, from vaudeville and the Catskills Borscht Belt; origin from the German "tummeln".
 tummel (Yid. טאַמעל): excitement (c.f. German "tummeln"= romp)
 tushie: or just tush—polite way of saying tuchus or backside; a pet phrase or diminutive meant to be cute when referring to the buttocks, esp. of a child, or used when speaking with children to refer to the buttocks.

U
 ungershpart (Yid. ייַנגעשפּאַרט ayngeshpart): stubborn. Derived from ייִנגער‎ (yinger, "younger"), from Old High German junc ("young"), and from שפּאַרט (shfart, "smart", as in "hurt").

V
 verbissen; verbissener (Yid., פֿאַרביסן; cf. German verbissen): adj. Bitter; sullen; crippled by bitterness.
 verblandzhet (Yid., פֿאַרבלאָנדזשעט; far- cf. German ver- and Polish błądzić = "to stray around"): lost, bewildered, confused, mixed-up (appropriately, there are several variant spellings)
 verdreyt (Yid., פֿאַרדרײט; drey meaning turn, cf. dreidel; also cf. German verdreht = "twisted"): confused, mixed-up, distracted
 verfrumt (Yid., פֿאַרפֿרומט): negative term for someone very religious or pious. "She came back from seminary and became all farfrumt." From Old High German fruma, cognate to German fromm.
 verklempt (Yid., פֿאַרקלעמט farklemt): choked up; speechless; unable to express one's feelings/emotions (cf. German verklemmt = "uptight"); stuck
 vershimmelt (Yid. פֿאַרשימלט farshmilt): shook up, rattled, in a state of nerves.  "She wasn't hurt in the accident, but she was pretty farshimmelt". (cf. German verschimmelt = mouldy)
 verkakte (Yid., פֿאַרקאַקטע): an adjective, meaning 'screwed up' or 'a bad idea'; literally, 'crapped' or 'becrapped', cf. German "verkackte(r)"
 vershtuft (Yid. פֿאַרשטופֿט farshtuft): (pejorative) pregnant, recently had sex, constipated. (stuffed) (cf. German "verstopft"= blocked)

W
 wilde chaya (Yid. װילדע חיה vilde chaye): impolite or undisciplined child, literally, wild beast. From Old High German wildi and Hebrew חייה (ḥaye, "animal").

Y
 yenta or yente (Yid. יענטא or יענטע): a talkative woman; a gossip; a blabbermouth; a scold.  Used as the name of the matchmaker in Fiddler on the Roof, who personifies these qualities. Derived from a common woman's name, Yenta.
 yichus (Yid. ייִחוס): pedigree, family background, an advantage. From Hebrew יחוס yiḥūs.
 Yiddishe Mama (Yid. ייִדישע מאַמאַ): a stereotypical Jewish mother
 Yiddisher kop (Yid. ייִדישער קאָפּ): intelligence (lit. "Jewish head"; German "Jüdischer Kopf": Jewish head)
 yiddisher mazel (Yid. ייִדישער מזל): bad luck (lit. "Jewish luck") From Hebrew מזל mazal, "constellation".
 Yontiff (Yid. יונטיב): a Jewish holiday on which work is forbidden, e.g. Rosh Hashanah, Yom Kippur, Pesach (from the Hebrew "Yom Tov", Good Day, or Holiday)
 yungatch (Yid. יונגאַטש yungatsh): a rascal. From יונג yung (OHG junc).

Z
 zach (Yid. זאַך): thing or item. When used with "ganzte" (גאַנץע), can refer to an event or story, e.g. "The ganzte zach only took two hours." The "whole thing" only took two hours (Old High German sahha; cf. German Sache)
 zaydeh (or zayde; Yid. זײדע zeyde): grandfather (possibly a Slavic word, cf. Polish dziadek, meaning "grandfather")
 zaftig or zoftig (Yid. זאַפֿטיק zaftik): plump, chubby, full-figured (German saftig, meaning juicy), especially with a child or an attractive woman

Yinglish words 
The Joys of Yiddish describes the following words as Yinglish except where noted as Ameridish:
 alrightnik, alrightnikeh, alrightnitseh – male, female, female individual who has been successful; nouveau riche
 bleib shver  – from German bleibt schwer, meaning remains difficult – unresolved problem, especially in Talmud learning (cf. wikt:תיקו)
 blintz (Yinglish because the true Yiddish is blintzeh)
 bluffer, blufferkeh – male, female person who bluffs
 boarderkeh, bordekeh – (Ameridish) female paying boarder
 boychick, boychikel, boychiklekh – young boy, kiddo, handsome
 bulbenik (Ameridish) – an actor who muffs his lines, from bilbul – mixup (alternative theory – bulba, literally potato, figuratively error)
 bummerkeh (Ameridish) – a female bum
 chutzpah (Ameridish) – audacity
 cockamamy false, ersatz, crazy (of an idea), artificial, jury-rigged (prob. from Eng. "decalcomania," a "decal," a sticker, a cheap process for transferring images from paper to glass.) In the Bronx, in the first half of the 20th century, a "cockamamie" was a washable temporary "tattoo" distributed in bubblegum packets.
 donstairsikeh, donstairsiker – female, male living downstairs
 dresske – bargain-basement dress
 fin – five, or five-dollar bill, shortened form of Yiddish פינף finif (five)
 kosher – Yinglish, not in its religious or Yiddish meanings, but only in five slang senses: authentic, trustworthy, legitimate, fair, and approved by a higher source. Its pronunciation, as "kōsher", is another distinguishing factor, as in true Yiddish it is pronounced "kūsher" or "kösher"
 mensch – a person of uncommon maturity and decency
 nextdoorekeh, nextdooreker – female, male living next door
 opstairsikeh, opstairsiker (Ameridish) – female, male living upstairs
 pisha paysha – corruption of English card game "Pitch and Patience"
 sharopnikel (Ameridish) – a small object that causes quieting, such as a pacifier, teething ring, cf. shaddap (shut up!)
 shmata – everyday clothing (literally "rags")
 shmegegge (Ameridish) – an unadmirable or untalented person
 shmo – shortened version of 'shmock' or 'shmearal', see 'shnuk'
 shnuk (Ameridish) – an idiotic person
 tararam – a big tummel
 tuchas – buttocks

See also
 List of English words of Hebrew origin
 List of German expressions in English
 List of English words of Yiddish origin
 Lists of English words by country or language of origin
 Yeshivish
 Scots-Yiddish

References

External links 
Jewish Language Research Website: Yiddish
On-line Yiddish dictionary
The Spoken Yiddish Language Project (Columbia University)
A nice list of choice Yiddish/Ameridish words
Bennett Muraskin, You Know More Yiddish Than You Think, Jewish Currents, December 10, 2014

Judeo-English languages
Macaronic forms of English
Yiddish
Lists of loanwords of Germanic origin